State Highway 30 (abbreviated SH-30) is a state highway in Oklahoma. It passes through Harmon, Beckham and Roger Mills counties. SH-30 does not have any letter-suffixed spur routes branching from it.

The SH-30 designation dates back to March 31, 1936, when it spanned from Erick to Sweetwater. The highway gradually evolved over the years, reaching its current form in 1970.

Route description
SH-30 begins at US-62 in Hollis, the seat of Harmon County. North of McKnight, the highway crosses the Salt Fork of the Red River. The highway bridges over the Elm Fork of the Red River about  before crossing into Beckham County.

 west of Erick, SH-30 intersects Interstate 40 Business. SH-30 begins a concurrency with the business loop, traveling east into the town. In Erick, SH-30 turns back to the north, interchanging with Interstate 40, then crossing the North Fork of the Red River and running through the unincorporated settlement of Mayfield. At this point, it crosses into Roger Mills County.

History
State Highway 30 was added to the highway system on March 31, 1936. At this time, SH-30 began at US-66 in Erick and ended at what was then numbered SH-41 (present-day SH-152) in Sweetwater. On November 18, the highway was extended west along US-66, then south, setting its southern terminus at its present location at US-62 in Hollis. The 1937 state highway map was the first to show SH-30.

The following year, a large portion of the highway was removed from the state highway system. On October 19, 1937, between the SH-9 junction and US-66, the route ceased to be maintained by the Department of Highways. SH-30 still appeared as such on the 1938 state highway map, but with dashed lines, indicating the route was not maintained. By the 1940 edition, SH-30 was not marked at all on the map between just north of SH-9 to US-66 west of Erick. As a result, SH-30 was effectively in two sections, one running from Hollis to SH-9, and another between Erick and Sweetwater.

On April 14, 1941, the southern SH-30 was extended further to the south. The highway proceeded east from Hollis along US-62, then, at Gould, turned south along what was previously an unnumbered farm-to-market road. The route turned back east to end at SH-34 and SH-44 in Eldorado. This extension encompassed all of the present-day western SH-5. By January 1942, however, this extension of SH-30 would be split off to form the new SH-90.

The two sections of SH-30 were reunited on August 13, 1945, with the reincorporation of the SH-9 to Erick stretch into the route. The newly-continuous highway was extended north three months later on November 21, when it was extended north of Sweetwater for the first time, ending in Reydon (concurrent with SH-47). On February 7, 1955, SH-30 was extended north to Durham.

From the late 1950s through the 1960s, SH-30 extended south to the Texas state line. The highway then ended at a bridge over the Prairie Dog Town Fork of the Red River, the southern Oklahoma–Texas boundary. The route was truncated back to Hollis on March 2, 1970.

Junction list

References

External links

 SH-30 at OKHighways

030
Transportation in Harmon County, Oklahoma
Transportation in Beckham County, Oklahoma
Transportation in Roger Mills County, Oklahoma